Charles "Chuck" D. Hansen is an American computer scientist at the University of Utah who works on scientific visualization. He is a Distinguished Professor, a Fellow of the IEEE and a founding faculty member of the Scientific Computing and Imaging Institute. He was an associate editor-in-chief of IEEE Transactions on Visualization and Graphics.

Biography 
Hansen received a BS in computer science from Memphis State University in 1981 and a PhD in computer science from the University of Utah in 1987. From 1989 to 1997, he was a Technical Staff Member in the Advanced Computing Laboratory (ACL) at Los Alamos National Laboratory, where he formed and directed the visualization efforts. He was a Bourse de Chateaubriand PostDoc Fellow at INRIA in Rocquencourt, France in 1987 and 1988. Since 1998, he has been a full professor in Computer Science at the University of Utah. In 2019, he was named a Distinguished Professor of Computing at the University of Utah. He was a visiting scientist at INRIA-Rhône-Alpes in the GRAVIR group in 2004-2005 and a visiting professor at the Joseph Fourier University in Grenoble in 2011-2012. In 2005, he won the IEEE Visualization Technical Achievement Award for his "seminal work on tools for understanding large-scale scientific data sets". In 2017, he was awarded the IEEE Technical Committee on Visualization and Graphics "Career Award" in recognition for his contributions to large scale data visualization, including advances in parallel and volume rendering, novel interaction techniques, and techniques for exploiting hardware; for his leadership in the community as an educator, program chair, and editor; and for providing vision for the development and support of the field. He was associate editor-in-chief of IEEE Transactions on Visualization and Graphics from 2003 to 2007, and again from 2014 to 2018. He was elected an IEEE Fellow in 2012.

Books

References 

Living people
American computer scientists
Fellow Members of the IEEE
University of Utah alumni
Computer graphics researchers
Los Alamos National Laboratory personnel
University of Utah faculty
Year of birth uncertain
Information visualization experts
University of Memphis alumni
Scientific computing researchers
Year of birth missing (living people)